The 1958 Vanderbilt Commodores football team represented Vanderbilt University in the 1958 NCAA University Division football season. The Commodores were led by head coach Art Guepe in his sixth season and finished the season with a record of five wins, two losses and three ties (5–2–3 overall, 2–1–3 in the SEC).

Schedule

References

Vanderbilt
Vanderbilt Commodores football seasons
Vanderbilt Commodores football